Al Shahaniya is a municipality (3299 km2) in Qatar, with its municipal seat has a city of the same name (39 km2). Formerly in the municipality of Al Rayyan, but now an independent municipality, the municipal seat was delimited in 1988 by Law No. 22. In 2014, the cabinet ratified a draft amending some provisions to the 1988 law, thereby formalizing Al Shahaniya as Qatar's eighth municipality.

Etymology

Al-Shahaniya derives its name from a plant known locally as 'sheeh' which was valued for its anti-inflammatory effects. A variation of this name is Al-Sheehaniya. The plant's Latin name is Artemisia inculta; it is an aromatic perennial that frequently grows in the Middle East and North Africa region but which is scarce in Qatar due to its unsuitable soils.

History
In 2014, Al-Shahaniya split off from Al Rayyan Municipality to form its own municipality. Integrating approximately 35% of Al Rayyan's area into the new municipality, some of Al Rayyan's western localities such as Al Gharbiam, Al Utouriya, Al Jemailiya, Umm Bab, Rawdat Rashed, Al Nasraniya, Dukhan and Al Khurayb were also included in the new municipality. Mohammed Al-Sahooti was the first mayor of the municipality. As of 2017, Mohammed Saif Al Hajri was mayor.

Geography

The municipality is well known for its sunken land-surfaces and vast plains. As such, there are upwards of 40 plains and 487 rawdas (depressions), the most important being Rawdat Rashed. Other geographic features listed by the Ministry of Municipality and Environment include 169 jeris (places where water flows), 71 hills, seven highlands, 13 sabkhas, and 15 capes. Rocky hills and limestone cliffs are found abundantly around the general area of Dukhan. Only one island is found off its shores; that being Janan Island.

Much of the municipality is occupied by Al Reem Biosphere Reserve, and there are numerous small villages dotted along the reserve's main highway. These villages typically have less than a 100 inhabitants and were built over the few existing water sources in the region, as is often reflected in their names.

Al-Shahaniya City is the largest settlement in the municipality as well as in central Qatar. It is located halfway between Dukhan and the capital Doha, and is situated just off Dukhan Highway. As an urban center, it serves as a central location for surrounding rural settlements, such as Rawdat Rashed and Al Khurayb. The majority of activity associated with camel racing and oryx breeding in Qatar take place within the municipality.

To the west of Al-Shahaniya is Dukhan, which constitutes the most important western Qatari city. It is an industrial city and was constructed for oil extraction purposes. QatarEnergy is chiefly responsible for the city's development and administration. Portions of Dukhan have expanded outside of the concession boundaries; these sections are controlled by the Ministry of Municipality and Environment.

Administrative divisions

The municipality is divided into 7 zones which are then divided into 467 blocks.

Administrative zones
The following zones were recorded in the 2015 population census:

Districts
Other settlements in Al Shahaniya include:

Abu Nakhla
Abu Sidrah
Afjan
Al Hamla
Al Kharsaah
Al Khattiya
Al Khurayb
Al Qa'iya
Al Ruwais West
Al Sahla Al Shamaliya
Al Samriya
Al Shabhana
Al Salamiya
Al Suwaihliya
Al Zeghain
Al Owaina
Jelaiha
Lehsain
Lehsiniya
Madinat Al Mawater
Qaryat Al Refaiq
Qaryat Al Muhanna
Ras Abrouq
Umm Al Daah Khawzan
Umm Al Maqarin
Umm Al Qahab Al Jadeeda
Umm Al Qahab Al Qadeema
Umm Al Zubar Al Qibliya
Umm Al Zubar East
Umm Ghuwailina
Umm Lebrak
Umm Leghab
Umm Leghab West
Umm Taqa
Umm Wishah
Wadi Laswaq
Wadi Lejmal Al Shamali
Zekreet

Economy

Oil and natural gas

In the early days of oil and natural gas exploration, Dukhan was Qatar's most important industrial city. Oil exploration first took place in 1935; this was proceeded by Dukhan's first oil well drilling in 1940. Presently, Dukhan represents one of the four historic industrial centers of Qatar. In addition to its oil and natural gas processing facilities, Dukhan also hosts a desalination plant and a sewage treatment plant.

Natural gas and oil distribution pipelines and pumping stations are located in Al-Shahaniya City, Al Khurayb, and Mazrouah.

Manufacturing
South of Dukhan is the industrial city of Umm Bab. Aside from accommodating Qatar's first major non-oil related industry in the form of a cement processing facility which began operation in 1969, there also exists minor oil and gas separation facilities within the city.

A substantial government wellfield in Rawdat Rashed was historically used as a water source for Umm Bab's cement industry. Currently, Rawdat Rashed is one of the three major landfill sites in Qatar, being used mainly for construction and demolition waste.

Agriculture

Agriculture is scarce in Al Shahaniya's southern sector because of its lack of groundwater and unsuitable soils. Several farms are located near the aquifer system of Rawdat Rashed. There are also small clusters of farms near Al Jemailiya and Al Utouriya.

In April 2018, the Animal Production Research Station was established in Al-Shahaniya City by the Ministry of Municipality and Environment. Spanning roughly 78,000 square meters and constructed at a cost of QR 30 million, its facilities include a research station, animal sheds and a veterinary clinic.

There is a major government-owned plant nursery which spans over 2,500 sq meters in the village of Al Utouriya. Plants grown in this nursery are used for research and also distributed to government ministries.

In a bid to improve the country's food self-sufficiency, Al Faisal Holding announced in 2017 that it would be constructing a poultry farm in Al Shahaniya with an production capacity of 3.5 million chickens annually and 80,000 eggs per day.

Education

As per the 2016 education census, thirty-one public schools operate within Al Shahaniya's boundaries. Of these schools, seventeen are exclusively for girls and the remaining fourteen are reserved for boys. Female students were numbered at 2,090, narrowly outnumbering the 2,036 male students.

Healthcare
According to the 2015 government census, 8 healthcare centers operate in the municipality.  In January 2012, Qatari officials, in tandem with the Cuban government, unveiled The Cuban Hospital in Dukhan. The hospital is located in the portion of Dukhan under municipal jurisdiction and serves the entire western region.

Transportation

Dukhan Road is the main road in the municipality, extending all the way from the capital Doha to Dukhan. Ashghal (the Public Works Authority) started a refurbishment project on the road in 2011. Works on the second phase were done in 2014, with new additions including two camel underpasses and a bicycle lane.

Infrastructure
In Al-Shahaniya City, a wide-scale public defense complex was inaugurated in 2010. Branches of various security organizations are hosted in the complex, such as the Dukhan Security Department. Two notable buildings in the complex are the Shahaniya Services Centre, which manages passports and travel documents and the Shahaniya Civil Defense Centre. North of the public services complex, off Al Utouriya Road, is the municipal headquarters.

A military base known as Al Dehailiyat Army Camp is located in Al Dehailiyat, an area near Al Shahaniya City.

Sports
Al-Shahania Sports Club is centered in the municipality. Formed in 1998, the club was originally based in Al Jemailiya, but shifted its headquarters to Al-Shahaniya City in 2001. It is most notable for its football team which at one point participated in Qatar's premier football league, the Qatar Stars League.

Qatar's main camel racetrack and camel training facilities are also located in the seat of the municipality. Robots are used to jockey the camels. One prominent competition that takes place on the track is the annual Founder Sheikh Jassim bin Mohammed bin Thani's Camel Festival.

Visitor attractions
In 1979 Qatar's government portioned off a 12 square km area of Al-Shahaniya as a sanctuary for Arabian oryxes, making it among the first protected environmental areas in the country. Oryxes for the reserve were transported from Muaither Farm by sheikh Abdulrahman bin Saud Al Thani. There were around 100 animals in the reserve in 1988. Aside from oryxes, there is an area of the reserve where red-necked ostriches are housed.

Sheikh Faisal Bin Qassim Al Thani Museum is a massive 530,000 square meter, 3-building museum established in 1998 in the municipality. It is located in Al Samriya, a locality of Al-Shahaniya City and is accessible through Dukhan Road.

References

 
Municipalities of Qatar